Shih Ming-teh (born 15 January 1941) commonly known as Nori Shih, is a statesman and human rights defender in Taiwan and was once a political prisoner for 25-and-a-half years.

Arrested at the age of 21 in 1962 and charged with creating the "Taiwan Independence League" (a study group) with the intention of overthrowing the Kuomintang government, Shih was sentenced to life imprisonment.  The sentence was commuted to 15 years in 1975, and Shih was released on 16 June 1977.

He promptly joined the Tangwai (literally meaning "outside the party", because the Kuomintang was the only legally existing political party in Taiwan at that time), became a reporter for the Liberty Times and married the American researcher Linda Gail Arrigo. After he played a part in organizing the 10 December 1979 pro-democracy rally subsequently known as the Kaohsiung Incident (also known as the Formosa Incident or Meilitao Incident), an arrest warrant was issued charging Shih with treason, and following 26 days on the run he was again arrested and sentenced to life in prison. In 1984, while he was incarcerated, Polish politician and Nobel Peace Prize laureate Lech Wałęsa nominated him for Peace Prize.

In July 1987, Chiang Ching-kuo lifted martial law and offered an amnesty to Shih, but he refused to accept. On 20 May 1990 he was finally released. In total, he spent 25 years in prison, 13 years in solitary confinement and over 4 years on hunger strike.

In 1993, he was elected leader of the legalized opposition Democratic Progressive Party. He was also elected legislator in three occasions. Shih's proposal of a political "Grand Reconciliation" in Taiwan, he resigned from the Democratic Progressive Party on 14 November 2000.

In 2006, Shih carried out a massive protest, known as Million Voices Against Corruption, President Chen Must Go, in an effort to force the embattled president Chen Shui-bian to resign. He led an around the clock sit-in in front of the Presidential Building and Taipei Railway Station in Taipei City, pledging to remain there until such time as President Chen resigned, or he reached the end of his term in March 2008. On 5 December 2006, he left Taipei Railway Station pledging to continue the protest alone in "self-reclusion" at an apartment nearby. This protest ended April 2007.

Shih was one of the most prominent personalities of the Tangwai movement and greatly contributed to Taiwan's democratization. He has been referred to by some as "Taiwan's Mandela".

Early life 
Shih Ming-te's father Shih Kuo-tsui was a well-known practitioner of Chinese medicine.

In February 1947, Shih Ming-te witnessed at Kaohsiung Station that would later be known as the February 28 Incident. The student leaders of schools were charged as instigators and some were executed as riots broke out. Students seized weapons from Harbor Garrison and exchanged fires with the guards.

He entered Kaohsiung's Chung-Cheng Senior High in 1957. In 1959, after failing to pass his college entrance exam, he signed up with the ROC Army, passing the admission exams for the artillery school. On occasion he vowed in public to overthrow the ROC government by force, through an armed coup d'état as an army officer. . That same year, his girlfriend gave birth to a daughter when he was 19.

He briefly served as an artillery officer in Kinmen.

First imprisonment: 1962–1977 
In 1962 Shih was arrested for alleged involvement in the "Formosa Independence Movement"; over 30 more accomplices, mostly army school and university students, were also arrested. Shih's two brothers, poet and painter Shih Ming-cheng and medical school student Shih Ming-hsiung were among them.

In 1964 Shih was sentenced to life imprisonment for orchestrating the independence movement. He was also stripped of his civil rights for life. Shih was roughened up and suffered the loss of his teeth and spinal damage at the age of 22.

The Kuomintang regime considered outspoken Shih as a highly dangerous political criminal and therefore prevented him from doing any forced labor that would put him in contact with the world outside prison. This gave him time to do research and study. Shih focused on philosophy, history, international law, linguistics and Japanese. He also developed a strong and resolute personality in prison.

In the 1970s, Taiwan's government suffered several blows to its international status. First, its seat at the United Nations was taken over by the People's Republic of China, then the United States established official ties with Beijing, severing those with Taipei. A rebellion in the Taiyuan prison, where many of the inmates were political prisoners, was planned. Access to the Taitung radio station and a publicly broadcast declaration of Taiwan's independence from China was one of their goals. Many pro-independence prisoners took part in the plot. On 8 February 1970 five prisoners murdered a guard and tried to take his gun. Ultimately the five inmates broke from prison, only to be caught soon after. The breakout plot was foiled. The Kuomintang believed Shih was one of the masterminds of the uprising and therefore kept him in isolation during his time in Taiyuan. To this date, the investigation documents are still kept confidential and the implication of Shih is disputed by Shih himself, who sued Lin Shu-chi for defamation.

In 1974, after 12 years of imprisonment, Shih's first wife Chen Li-chu asked for divorce. She had had an affair with one of Shih's friends, who was released before Shih. In 1975, when president Chiang Kai-shek died, his son Chiang Ching-kuo succeeded as KMT Chairman. Under his rule, a leniency policy was implemented. On 16 June 1977, Shih was released after serving only 15 years of a life sentence.

Leader of the Kaohsiung Incident 

During Chiang Ching-kuo's presidency, political opposition to the Kuomintang was suppressed. After Peter Huang's attempt to assassinate Chiang proved unsuccessful, the KMT became more aware of opposition. Shih Ming-teh created a "party without a name" amidst the absence of freedom of association in Taiwan at that time. In September 1978 Shih became active in the Tangwai movement. In May 1979 this group of non-Kuomintang activists established the Meilitao Magazine, of which Shih was named general manager. During this time, he adopted the English nickname "Nori", after the Japanese pronunciation of the second Chinese character in his given name, "Teh". For historical reasons, this nickname served as a shibboleth to enrage Waishengren people in Taiwan (mainlanders whose ancestors fought the Japanese), and endear him to the benshengren (less-recent Hokkien migrants disenfranchised by the Waishengren, and who have a more positive view of Japanese colonization). On 10 December 1979, the Tangwai group commemorated the Human Rights Day in Kaohsiung. The rally operated without prior approval, with specific stipulations that no torches and weapons were allowed. Police intervened and clashed with the protestors resulting in various damages. The event would be known as the Kaohsiung Incident, a milestone in Taiwan's democratization process.

Three days later, Shih dramatically escaped: Chang Wen-ying, then a dentist and later Mayor of Taichung City, performed plastic surgery on Shih to change his looks so he could escape overseas. Shih was later caught along with the dentist, and sentenced to life in prison for the second time.

During the 1980 Meilitao Incident trials Shih was defiant and proud facing a potentially fatal court-martial decision. He declared during his defense: "Taiwan should be independent, in fact, it already is, it has been for 30 years and currently it is known as the Republic of China". Shih also demanded an end to the political monopoly of the Kuomintang, the control of the Taiwanese press, and martial law, so that the 30-plus-year rubber-stamping legislative session could be dissolved.

Second imprisonment and hunger strike: 1980–1990 
In 1983, one of  Shih's allies, Chen Wen-chen, was murdered; Shih Ming-te began a 1-month hunger strike to protest what he believed to be an assassination ordered by the secret police.

Polish union leader Lech Wałęsa (Nobel Peace 1983) nominated Shih Ming-teh for the 1984 Nobel Peace Prize..

In 1985, Shih commenced an indefinite hunger strike. He demanded an end to martial law and state-sponsored political murders, implementation of a democratic system and release of all Meilitao Incident political prisoners. Shih was sent to the Tri-Service General Hospital and underwent force-feeding through a nasogastric tube during his four and half years of protest.

On 15 July 1987, the 38-year-long order of martial law was declared over by the KMT government, when President Chiang Ching-kuo announced nationwide sentence reductions and conditional releases. Shih declined the offer. In 1988, Shih went on another hunger strike protest with his brother Shih Ming-cheng. His brother died on 23 August 1988; Shih survived.

Release 
On 20 May 1990, the new president Lee Teng-hui officially assumed the presidency and ordered a special amnesty for all Meilitao Incident prisoners. Shih ripped up his amnesty document and demanded an unconditional release. When President Lee announced the invalidation of the Meilitao Trials, Shih Ming-te finally accepted his release as an innocent person. Upon recovering his freedom, he joined the now legal Democratic Progressive Party, which originated in the Tangwai movement.

Political career 
In 1992, Shih was elected legislator for the Tainan County constituency in the Legislative Yuan. This election was the first free direct legislative elections in Taiwan history.

Between 1994 and 1996 Shih was elected Chairman of the Democratic Progressive Party. During his tenure, he claimed that "Taiwan is already an independent and sovereign nation, when the Democratic Progressive Party is in power, there is no need and it will not announce Taiwan's independence". At the same time Shih proposed a political and social Grand Reconciliation. Elected legislator for a new term in 1996, he ran for the presidency of the Legislative Yuan, gaining a vote from former archrival New Party but losing one from Democratic Progressive Party legislator Chang Chin-cheng. Liu Sung-pan was elected the President of the Legislative Yuan.

On 23 March 1996, Taiwan's first direct presidential election was held. The Democratic Progressive Party's candidate was defeated by incumbent president Lee Teng-hui, with only 21.1% of the vote(The DPP got around 30% in before regional elections). Shih Ming-teh resigned to his position as party chief, and Chang Chun-hsiung assumed as acting leader of the opposition party. Shih shifted his attention to the completion of the "Meilitao Oral History Records".

On 1 April 1997, Shih was indicted for a violation to the Mass Gathering and Demonstration Act. He had organized in 1992 a protest demanding direct presidential elections. Huang Hsin-chieh, Hsu Hsin-liang and Lin Yi-hsiung went to prison with Shih for 50 days. This was the third time Shih was imprisoned, but now as a legislator. He was released after 41 days.

In 1998, Shih was re-elected legislator but this time representing a Taipei City constituency. He would continue his efforts for the completion of the "Meilitao Oral History Records". In three years, 200 individuals of the political spectrum. The oral testimonies amounted to over 6 million words, and were edited to a 600,000 word four volume version. To date, this is the most comprehensive historical research of the 1970–1990 era in Taiwan's development, earning it a publishing prize. This was the result of Shih's individual efforts, using his own financial and personal resources. Neither the Democratic Progressive Party nor the government of Taiwan have helped complete this overwhelming historic research project.

In 2000, Chen Shui-bian, the former Mayor of Taipei City, was elected president. Shih congratulated the leader of the Democratic Progressive Party Lin Yi-hsiung for the triumph. He said in an interview that since his childhood dream of ousting the Chiang's KMT regime had been accomplished, he would leave the political party. In May, Chen before he assumed the presidency, visited Shih's office to personally ask him if he was willing to be appointed senior political advisor. Shih rejected Chen's offer once more, but instead proposed Hsu Hsin-liang for the position.

Shih condemned President Chen for leading the country with a minority government, ignoring the KMT majority in the Legislative Yuan and risking political stability. After Chen rejected his suggestion for an alliance with the opposition majority in the Legislative Yuan, Shih further walked away from the party. Believing that Taiwan's greatest challenge in the 21st century was globalization, together with former colleagues Hsu Hsin-liang and Sisy Chen, famous Wen Shih-ren and a dozen others intellectuals and entrepreneurs, founded the "Shan (Mountain) Alliance". Their goal: to draw a road map for Taiwan in the 21st century.

Shih ran as an independent twice, in December 2001 and December 2004. On the first occasion he lost with 24,925 votes, on the second he narrowly lost the race by receiving 26,974 votes in the highly contested Taipei North Constituency. He had proposed a parliamentary political system to overcome the aggravation of political differences in Taiwan's society.

In December 2002, Shih ran as Mayor candidate for Kaohsiung City. His platform: turn the port-city into a free port, much like Hong Kong or Amsterdam, to cope with the challenge of globalization. Direct maritime links with Chinese ports was also part of the proposal. Shih perceived that the political division was so severe that he decided to announce his withdrawal three days before the election.

In September 2003, Shih Ming-te was a visiting scholar at George Mason University for a one-year period. During his tenure, Shih researched what he called the "One China: European Union Model" as a means of ending the impasse between the two sides of the Taiwan Strait, and reiterated his proposal for a constitutional amendment in favor of a parliamentary system, in an attempt to put an end to the political polarization into the two camps (blue or Kuomintang-based and green or Democratic Progressive Party-centered) which was deteriorating into ethnic rivalry between Chinese refugees coming to rule Taiwan in 1949, and those who were there before that time.

On 6 October 2005, the Department of Political Science at the National Taiwan University opens the "Shih Ming-te Lecture" series; ethnic harmony, political reconciliation and cross-Strait peace are its core values.

In May, 2006, "Shih Ming-te Lecture" invited Frederik Willem de Klerk, Former State President of South Africa, to a dialog with Shih Ming-te: "Maintaining Peace: South Africa's Experience, a Perspective for Taiwan?" was the topic.

In May 2015, Shih announced his intention to run for president as an independent candidate in 2016. He again reiterated the Broad One China Framework first proposed in 2014, in which China and Taiwan govern one legal entity separately. Both governments would be allowed to join international organizations and not use military force against the other, instead "resolving issues through consensus." Shih ended his campaign in September, as he had not been able to fulfill the Central Election Commission requirements needed to stand in the 2016 election.

Million Voices Against Corruption, Chen Must Go Campaign

Chronology
On 9 August 2006, Shih wrote an open letter to President Chen Shui-bian, whose aides, wife and son-in-law were implicated in several corruption cases. Shih urged Chen to resign as a display of strength in times of crisis, respect for public opinion and acknowledgement of wrongdoing. Ironically, Chen Shui-bian had been Shih's defense attorney in the aftermath of the Kaohsiung Incident and had been imprisoned for 18 months himself.

On 12 August 2006, Shih gave a keynote speech to kick-start the "Million Voices Against Corruption-Chen Must Go" campaign in the February 28 Incident Memorial Park. He argued that the people could not bear with so much corruption anymore. Shih asks all those who support the movement a NT$100 (US$3, €2.3) donation as a symbol of commitment and consent, as well as a display of determination to ask Chen Shui-bian to leave the Presidential Office. Shih vowed to lead the people in a protest until Chen Shui-bian stepped down if the donations came in. By 22 August 2006, a sum equivalent of that from over 1 million people had been received (the actual number of donators cannot be computed because there was no restriction on the maximum amount of money one could transfer to the designated account) in only seven days. The designated account was quickly closed and the preparations for the marathon protest started.

On 1 September 2006, the anti-corruption campaign organizers started training for the sit-ins (emergency procedures in case of police intervention). The sit-in began on a rainy day on 9 September 2006. According to the Chinapost, over 300,000 people gathered that day on Ketagalan Avenue, in front of the Presidential Building in Taipei under the pouring rain. The Taipei Police Department claimed there were only 100,00 protestors. According to the organizers' request, most of them were wearing red shirts; no controversial flags or political icons should be displayed, not even the Republic of China flag, perceived as a pro-Kuomintang device. Some protestors still brought along a small Republic of China flag or other campaign items with them.

On 15 September 2006, a Democratic Progressive Party Taipei city counselor booked the Ketagalan Boulevard site where the red-clad protestors were still gathered. Shih Ming-teh decided to move the protest to Taipei Railway Station. A climax was reached the night of the procession: a large perimeter of over 5.5 kilometers around the heavily guarded Presidential Building and Residence at the heart of Taipei was quickly flooded by peaceful red-clad protestors: the China Post reported that over 8 hundred thousand people had joined the candlelight encirclement; the Taipei Police again contradicted this with an estimate of 3 hundred thousand.

On 22 September 2006, Shih declared that he would not form his own political party nor participate in any political negotiations, he also made it clear that he was not willing to engage in negotiations with former president Lee Teng-hui; instead he would stay with the red-clad anti-Chen protestors. On 20 November 2006, Shih Ming-te urged Taipei City Mayor Ma Ying-jeou (the Kuomintang's 2008 presidential hopeful) to resign amidst accusations of corruption. Shih said he was not contemplating anti-corruption protests against Ma, but insisted there should not be double standards regarding corruption allegations. Ma was acquitted.

On 30 November 2006, the last night of protest by the Million Voices Against Corruption, Chen Must Go Campaign. Shih Ming-te later travelled to Thailand for a TV interview and panel discussion.

On 7 December 2006, the Special State Funds case of President Chen and his wife was underway, campaign organizers claimed that Taiwan needed to go back to normal, but Shih would protest until Chen steps down. On 1 April 2007, Shih announced the end to his self-imprisonment and started preparations for the second stage of the anti-Chen campaign. Plans involved presenting candidates for the next legislative elections. Originally scheduled for late 2007, the elections would instead be carried out in early 2008.

Controversy 
Shih is often considered a "romantic revolutionary" in Taiwan media. He believes that he is rooted in his ability "to pursue unlimited aspirations and ideals under restrictive conditions". The latest editions of Taiwan's High-School textbooks list Shih Ming-teh as a political activist. Shih's former Legislative Yuan secretary, cartoonist and writer , thinks Shih "is never quite sure of his own place in history".

Shih is accused by his ex-wife Chen, Li Zhu, in her book, "The Innocent Song of a Taiwanese Woman," of using her as a sex toy, and failing his responsibility as a husband.  Chen also claimed Shih been indifferent to his responsibility toward their daughter. Shih Ming-te often says: "I have been locked up for 25 years, where were you then?".

Another former secretary of Shih, Kuo Wen-pin, wrote about his opinion of Shih on Taiwan Daily (15 October 2000): Taking a look at 40 years of his struggle for Taiwan's democracy, he revealed himself as a visionary, making several pioneering proposals ahead of his time.

Over 20 years ago, Shih already said the four evils of Taiwan's path towards democracy were the political monopoly by the Kuomintang, the press control in Taiwan, the martial law and the "". Risking death penalty, Shih advocated for a "Republic of China, Taiwanese Independence Model", and added that "Taiwan is already an independent country, it has been so for over 30 years". For his opinions, Shih was considered seditious and the media, organizations, academia, everyone attacked him and humiliated him, only for the Democratic Progressive Party to adopt and implement his ideas; they even led the way to Lee Teng-hui's "Silent Revolution" political compromises. When the Kuomintang's 50 years in power ended, the Chen Shui-bian administration accepted some of his teachings. Arrests and repression are no longer the defensive measures of the regime when facing harsh criticism, but the abuse of public power and the media by individuals to insult, humiliate, and defame others is still common practice. The DPP party has vowed to improve its image with more diplomatic means, but this has yet to be seen.

In the aftermath of Shih's "red-shirt" movement, he became a darling of PRC-controlled media, including CCTVPhoenix TV, and the People's Daily.  Shih's efforts in discrediting the DPP have been widely praised and reported by various media outlets controlled or owned by the Chinese government. On 20 November 2006, ifeng.com, web portal of pro-CCP television channel Phoenix TV, reported Shih planned a trip to Thailand to discuss his "red shirt" philosophy.  In the same article, Shih also rebutted claims by representative of the American Institute in Taiwan that the red shirts instigated violence and caused social upheaval.

On 16 January 2010, chinanews.com.cn, a PRC media outlet, reported the possibility of Shih running for presidency in 2012. On 19 April 2010, www.chinataiwan.org, a Chinese government sponsored site, reported Shih claimed numerous prominent DPP leaders, including Chen Shui-bian and Hsieh Chang-ting, were undercover agents for the Kuomintang against political dissidents during the 1980s. According to Huaxia.com, yet another pro-CCP website, Shih's accusations have caused a general panic in the DPP. A former supporter and pastor of the Presbyterian Church, Wang, Jie Nan, wrote an opinion piece highlighting his disappointment with Shih, starting from Shih's "red shirt" movement and his subsequent efforts to undermine the DPP with outlandish accusations.

On 17 April 2011, Shih courted controversy when he asked Tsai Ing-Wen to publicly disclose her sexual orientation before she participated in her presidential bid. Despite his own support for LGBT rights in Taiwan, Shih was roundly criticized by major women's groups including the Awakening Foundation, the Taiwan Women's Link and the Taiwan Gender Equity Education Association. Tsai herself characterized the request as "surprising" and refused to reply.

Works 

•Shih Ming-te, 2021, "死囚  ("Death row inmates ")—— Memoire of Shih Ming-te 1962-1964 volume I ", new edition. Taipei, China times publishing Co.

•Shih Ming-te, 2006, "" ("Spring in a Prison Cell"), new edition. Taipei, Linking books.

•Shih Ming-te, 2002, " ("The Selfless Devotee"). Taipei, Commonwealth Publishing Group.

•New Taiwan Foundation, 2002, "" ("A timeless theme: dialogs between Shih Ming-te and Wei Jingsheng"), Taipei, Linking books.

•Shih Ming-te, 2001, " ("Reading Shih Ming-te"). Taipei, New Taiwan Foundation.

•Shih Ming-te, 1988, "" ("Shih Ming-te's Political Testament: The Formosa Incident Hearings"). Taipei, Avanguard.

•Shih Ming-te, 1989, "" ("Spring in a Prison Cell"), Kaohsiung, Tunli Publishing.

•Shih Ming-te, 1992, "" ("Spring in a Prison Cell: A Collection of Essays"). Taipei, Avangard.

•New Taiwan Foundation, 1995, "" ("Shih Ming-te's Three-year Term in the Legislative Yuan"). Taipei, New Taiwan Foundation.

See also

Politics of the Republic of China
Kaohsiung Incident
Million Voices Against Corruption, President Chen Must Go

References

Further reading 

 Chee Soon Juan, 1998, 《To be Free – stories from Asia's Struggle against Oppression》Australia, Monash Asia Institute Monash University
 
 
 
 
 
 
 
 
 

1941 births
Democratic Progressive Party Members of the Legislative Yuan
Taiwan independence activists
Civil rights activists
Democratic Progressive Party chairpersons
Taiwanese male writers
Taiwanese revolutionaries
Living people
Taiwanese democracy activists
Taiwanese human rights activists
Taiwanese people of Hoklo descent
Taiwanese prisoners sentenced to life imprisonment
Prisoners sentenced to life imprisonment by Taiwan
Politicians of the Republic of China on Taiwan from Kaohsiung
Tainan Members of the Legislative Yuan
Members of the 2nd Legislative Yuan
Members of the 3rd Legislative Yuan
Members of the 4th Legislative Yuan
Hunger strikers